Litchfield is an unincorporated community in central Litchfield Township, Medina County, Ohio, United States. It is situated at the junction of State Routes 83 and 18, about nine miles northwest of the city of Medina.

A post office called Litchfield has been in operation since 1832. The community takes its name from Litchfield Township.

This town is part of the Buckeye Local School District, along with Liverpool Township and York Township.

Notable people
Oviatt Cole, Ohio State Auditor.
Josephine Sophia White Griffing, reformer.

References

Unincorporated communities in Medina County, Ohio
Populated places established in 1831
1831 establishments in Ohio
Unincorporated communities in Ohio